Manders is a Dutch surname. It is derived from Middle Dutch mandel (Modern Dutch amandel = almond/almond tree) It may refer to:

Adrian Manders (1912–1967), American state politician
Arnold Manders (born 1959), Bermudian cricketer
 (born 1962), Dutch actor
Clarence "Pug" Manders (1913–1985), American football player
Dave Manders (born 1941), American football player
Hal Manders (1917–2010), American baseball pitcher
Henri Manders (born 1960), Dutch road bicycle racer
Henry Manders (1825–1891), New Zealand politician
Jack Manders (1909–1977), American football player
John E. Manders (1895–1973), Mayor of Anchorage, Alaska, opponent of Alaskan statehood
Henry Manders (died 1891), New Zealand Member of Parliament
Mark Manders (born 1968), Dutch artist
Taurean Manders (born 1986), Bermudian footballer
Toine Manders (born 1956), Dutch politician
Tom Manders (Dutch artist) (1921–1972), Dutch artist, comedian and cabaret performer

Fictional characters 

Bunny Manders, in the Raffles novels of E. W. Hornung
Parson Manders, in the Ibsen play Ghosts

See also
Mander (surname)

Dutch-language surnames